The Coffman–Graham algorithm is an algorithm for arranging the elements of a partially ordered set into a sequence of levels. The algorithm chooses an arrangement such that an element that comes after another in the order is assigned to a lower level, and such that each level has a number of elements that does not exceed a fixed width bound . When , it uses the minimum possible number of distinct levels, and in general it uses at most  times as many levels as necessary.

It is named after Edward G. Coffman, Jr. and Ronald Graham, who published it in 1972 for an application in job shop scheduling. In this application, the elements to be ordered are jobs, the bound  is the number of jobs that can be scheduled at any one time, and the partial order describes prerequisite relations between the jobs. The goal is to find a schedule that completes all jobs in minimum total time. Subsequently, the same algorithm has also been used in graph drawing, as a way of placing the vertices of a directed graph into layers of fixed widths so that most or all edges are directed consistently downwards.

For a partial ordering given by its transitive reduction (covering relation), the Coffman–Graham algorithm can be implemented in linear time using the partition refinement data structure as a subroutine. If the transitive reduction is not given, it takes polynomial time to construct it.

Problem statement and applications
In the version of the job shop scheduling problem solved by the Coffman–Graham algorithm, one is given a set of  jobs , together with a system of precedence constraints  requiring that job  be completed before job  begins. Each job is assumed to take unit time to complete. The scheduling task is to assign each of these jobs to time slots on a system of  identical processors, minimizing the makespan of the assignment (the time from the beginning of the first job until the completion of the final job). Abstractly, the precedence constraints define a partial order on the jobs, so the problem can be rephrased as one of assigning the elements of this partial order to levels (time slots) in such a way that each time slot has at most as many jobs as processors (at most  elements per level), respecting the precedence constraints. This application was the original motivation for Coffman and Graham to develop their algorithm.

In the layered graph drawing framework outlined by  the input is a directed graph, and a drawing of a graph is constructed in several stages:
A feedback arc set is chosen, and the edges of this set reversed, in order to convert the input into a directed acyclic graph with (if possible) few reversed edges.
The vertices of the graph are given integer -coordinates in such a way that, for each edge, the starting vertex of the edge has a higher coordinate than the ending vertex, with at most  vertices sharing the same -coordinate. In this way, all edges of the directed acyclic graph and most edges of the original graph will be oriented consistently downwards.
Dummy vertices are introduced within each edge so that the subdivided edges all connect pairs of vertices that are in adjacent levels of the drawing.
Within each group of vertices with the same -coordinate, the vertices are permuted in order to minimize the number of crossings in the resulting drawing, and the vertices are assigned -coordinates consistently with this permutation.
The vertices and edges of the graph are drawn with the coordinates assigned to them.
In this framework, the -coordinate assignment again involves grouping elements of a partially ordered set (the vertices of the graph, with the reachability ordering on the vertex set) into layers (sets of vertices with the same -coordinate), which is the problem solved by the Coffman–Graham algorithm. Although there exist alternative approaches than the Coffman–Graham algorithm to the layering step, these alternatives in general are either not able to incorporate a bound on the maximum width of a level or rely on complex integer programming procedures.

More abstractly, both of these problems can be formalized as a problem in which the input consists of a partially ordered set and an integer .

The algorithm
The Coffman–Graham algorithm performs the following steps.
In the graph drawing applications of the Coffman–Graham algorithm, the resulting directed acyclic graph may not be the same as the graph being drawn, and in the scheduling applications it may not have an edge for every precedence constraint of the input: in both cases, the transitive reduction removes redundant edges that are not necessary for defining the partial order.
If two vertices have the same most recently added incoming neighbor, the algorithm breaks the tie in favor of the one whose second most recently added incoming neighbor is earlier, etc.

Analysis

Output quality
A closely related algorithm also finds the optimal solution for scheduling of jobs with varying lengths, allowing pre-emption of scheduled jobs, on two processors. When the partial order of precedence constraints is an interval order, or belongs to several related classes of partial orders, the Coffman–Graham algorithm finds a solution with the minimum number of levels regardless of its width bound.

A related algorithm can be used to minimize the total flow time for a version of the problem in which preemption of jobs is allowed.

Time complexity
 and  state the time complexity of the Coffman–Graham algorithm, on an -element partial order, to be . However, this analysis omits the time for constructing the transitive reduction, which is not known to be possible within this bound.   shows how to implement the topological ordering stage of the algorithm in linear time, based on the idea of partition refinement. Sethi also shows how to implement the level assignment stage of the algorithm efficiently by using a disjoint-set data structure.

References

Graph drawing
Processor scheduling algorithms
Optimal scheduling